Fabian Sebastian Gaffke (August 5, 1913 – February 8, 1992) was a right fielder who played in Major League Baseball between  and  for the Boston Red Sox (1936–39) and Cleveland Indians (1941–42). He was born in Milwaukee, Wisconsin. 
  
In a six-season career, Gaffke was a .227 hitter (73-for-321) with seven home runs and 42 RBI in 129 games, including 43 runs, 14 doubles, four triples, and two stolen bases.

Gaffke died in his homeland of Milwaukee, Wisconsin at age 78.

Sources

Boston Red Sox players
Cleveland Indians players
Major League Baseball right fielders
Baseball players from Milwaukee
1913 births
1992 deaths